Amitava Bhattacharjee may refer to:

 Amitava Bhattacharjee (physicist), theoretical plasma physicist
 Amitabh Bhattacharjee (born 1973), Indian actor
 Amitabh Bhattacharya (born 1976), Indian lyricist and playback singer

See also
 Bhattacharya (surname)